A color code is a system for displaying information by using different colors.

The earliest examples of color codes in use are for long-distance communication by use of flags, as in semaphore communication. The United Kingdom adopted a color code scheme for such communication wherein red signified danger and white signified safety, with other colors having similar assignments of meaning.

As chemistry and other technologies advanced, it became expedient to use coloration as a signal for telling apart things that would otherwise be confusingly similar, such as wiring in electrical and electronic devices, and pharmaceutical pills.

The use of color codes has been extended to abstractions, such as the Homeland Security Advisory System color code in the United States. Similarly, hospital emergency codes often incorporate colors (such as the widely used "Code Blue" indicating a cardiac arrest), although they may also include numbers, and may not conform to a uniform standard.

Color codes do present some potential problems. On forms and signage, the use of color can distract from black and white text. They are often difficult for color blind and blind people to interpret, and even for those with normal color vision, use of many colors to code many variables can lead to use of confusingly similar colors.

Examples
Systems incorporating color-coding include:

In electricity:
25-pair color code – telecommunications wiring
ATX power connector
Audio connectors
Video connectors
Optical fibers
Electrical wiring – AC power phase, neutral, and grounding wires
Electronic color code AKA resistor or EIA color code (today - IEC 60062:2016 )
Ethernet twisted-pair wiring – local area networks
Jumper cables used to jump-start a vehicle
PC99 connectors and ports
Surround sound ports and cables
Three-phase electric power (electrical wiring)
In video games
Health and magic points
To distinguish friend from foe, for instance in StarCraft, Halo, or League of Legends
To distinguish rarity or quality of items in adventure and role-playing games
In navigation:
Characteristic light
Navigation light
Sea mark
Traffic lights
Other technology:
At point of sale (especially for packaging within a huge range of products: to quickly differentiate variants, brands, categories)
Bottled gases
Fire extinguishers
Kerbside collection 
Pipe marking
Queen bee birth year code
Underground utility location
In military use:
Artillery shells and other munitions, which are color-coded according to their pyrotechnic contents
List of Rainbow Codes
NATO Military Symbols for Land Based Systems
Rainbow Herbicides
In social functions:
Black hat hacking, white hat, grey hat
Blue-collar worker, white-collar worker, pink-collar worker, grey-collar, green-collar worker
Handkerchief code
ISO 22324, Guidelines for color-coded alerts in public warning
 Cooper's Color Code of the combat mindset
Rank in Judo
Ribbon colors see: :Category:Ribbon symbolism
 In religion:
 Clerical vestments, frontals and altar hangings in Christian churches

See also 
 Color coding in data visualization
 
 Secondary notation

References

External links

 
Encodings